The Home Front Defense Ministry was a ministry in the Israeli government. The post was created for Matan Vilnai by Prime Minister Benjamin Netanyahu on January 19, 2011. At the time, Netanyahu explained his reasoning for the establishment of the new ministry:

Between 2007 and 2011 Vilnai was effectively in charge of Home Front coordination in his capacity as Deputy Minister of Defense under Ehud Barak.

List of ministers

References

Home Front
Ministry of Home Front Defense
Home Front